Covington Courthouse Square Historic District is a national historic district located at Covington, Fountain County, Indiana. The district encompasses 23 contributing buildings in the central business district of Covington.  It developed between about 1856 and 1956, and includes notable examples of Gothic Revival, Italianate, Romanesque Revival, Classical Revival, and Art Deco style architecture.  Located in the district is the separately listed Fountain County Courthouse.  Other notable contributing buildings include the Loeb Building (c. 1870), Old Covington City Building (1903, 1915), First National Bank (1913), Knights of Pythias Building (1894), and Covington Post Office (1956).

It was listed on the National Register of Historic Places in 2015.

References

Historic districts on the National Register of Historic Places in Indiana
Gothic Revival architecture in Indiana
Romanesque Revival architecture in Indiana
Italianate architecture in Indiana
Neoclassical architecture in Indiana
Art Deco architecture in Indiana
Historic districts in Fountain County, Indiana
National Register of Historic Places in Fountain County, Indiana
Courthouses on the National Register of Historic Places in Indiana